The Scott Bond Family Plot is a historic family burial plot in Madison, Arkansas. It contains the burial site of Scott Bond (1852–1933), Arkansas' first Black millionaire.

Born into slavery, Bond became a major landowner and businessman in St. Francis County, and at age 60 his personal net worth was estimated to exceed $2 million. He died at age 81, gored to death by an ox on his farm.

Description 
The plot measures , and consists of two markers surrounded by a low concrete border.

NHRP listing 
The site was listed on the National Register of Historic Places in 2002.

See also
National Register of Historic Places listings in St. Francis County, Arkansas

References

External links
 

Cemeteries on the National Register of Historic Places in Arkansas
Buildings and structures completed in 1933
National Register of Historic Places in St. Francis County, Arkansas
African-American cemeteries in Arkansas
1933 establishments in Arkansas
Cemeteries established in the 1930s